is a Japanese manga series written and illustrated by Wadapen. It was serialized in Shueisha's seinen manga magazine Ultra Jump from November 2019 to September 2022.

Publication
Wicked Trapper: Hunter of Heroes, written and illustrated by Wadapen, ran in Shueisha's seinen manga magazine Ultra Jump from November 19, 2019, to September 16, 2022. Shueisha released its first tankōbon volume on April 17, 2020.

In September 2021, Seven Seas Entertainment announced that they had licensed the manga for English physical and digital releases in North America and the first volume is set to be released in March 2022.

Volume list

References

External links
 

Dark fantasy anime and manga
Isekai anime and manga
Seinen manga
Seven Seas Entertainment titles
Shueisha manga